Iijima is a Japanese surname. Notable people with the surname include:

Ai Iijima (1972–2008), Japanese actress, media personality
Eiji Iijima (born 1979), Japanese shogi player
, Japanese sprinter and baseball player
Junichi Iijima (born 1954), Japanese computer scientist  
Kametaro Iijima, Japanese Consul General in 1913
Mari Iijima (born 1963), Japanese singer-songwriter
Naoko Iijima (born 1968), japanese actress
Sumio Iijima (born 1939), discoverer of carbon nanotubes
Tadashi Iijima (1902–1996), Japanese film critic
Yukari Iijima (born 1964), Japanese politician (Liberal Democratic Party)

Japanese-language surnames